The 2018 EMF Euro was the eighth edition of the EMF miniEURO for national Small-sided football teams, and the fifth governed by the European Minifootball Federation. It took place in Kyiv, Ukraine, from 12 to 18 August 2018.

The final tournament included 20 teams.

Draw
The final tournament draw was held in Ukrainian football federation headquarters in Kyiv on 11 May 2018.

Group stage

Group A

Group B

Group C

Group D

Knockout stage

Bracket

Quarter-finals

Semi-finals

Bronze medal game

Final

Final ranking

Goalscorers 
There have been 185 goals scored in 48 matches, for an average of 3.85 goals per match.

1 goals

References

External links
 EMF Euro 2018 official website
 Official EMF website
 European Minifootball Federation on Facebook
 Euro Minifootball Federation on Twitter
 Minifootball Europe on Instagram
 Euro Minifootball on YouTube

2018
International association football competitions hosted by Ukraine
2018 in European sport
2018–19 in Ukrainian football
2018
2010s in Kyiv
August 2018 sports events in Europe